This is a list of secret police organisations and intelligence agencies which are fictional:

Contemporary world

Superheroes

Science-fiction

Dystopian futures

Star Trek Universe 
 Tal Shiar – Romulan secret police and intelligence agency
 Obsidian Order – Cardassian secret police and intelligence agency 
 Starfleet Intelligence – Federation intelligence agency
 Section 31 – Rogue and officially nonexistent Federation intelligence organization
 V'Shar – The Vulcan Intelligence & Security agency

Star Wars Universe 
 Imperial Intelligence – intelligence arm of the Galactic Empire
 Imperial/Sith Intelligence – intelligence arm of the reborn Sith Empire
 Imperial Security Bureau (ISB) – secret police of the Galactic Empire
 Republic Intelligence – intelligence service of the Galactic Republic
 Clone Intelligence – branch of the Republic Intelligence during the Clone Wars
 New Republic Intelligence (NRI) – intelligence service of the New Republic 
 Galactic Alliance Intelligence – intelligence service of the Galactic Federation of Free Alliances, the successor government to the New Republic
 Bothan Spynet – intelligence service of the Bothans, affiliated with the Rebel Alliance and its successor states the New Republic and the Galactic Alliance
 Public Safety Service (PSS) – the successor of the Corellian Security Force, after the Imperial government turns the latter from a regular police force into a secret police.
 Galactic Alliance Guard (GAG) – the secret police of the Galactic Federation of Free Alliances during the Second Galactic Civil War (fate after the war unknown).
 Rakatan-run Force Hounds – from the Star Wars expanded universe

Fantasy

See also
Government
Emergency
Police
List of fictional espionage organizations

References

Secret police organisations
 
 
Fictional